"The Happiest Days of Our Lives" is a song by Pink Floyd. It appeared on The Wall album in 1979.

Composition
The song is approximately one minute, 46 seconds in length, beginning with 24 seconds of a helicopter sound effect, followed by the schoolmaster shouting, "You! Yes, you! Stand still, laddie!" performed by Roger Waters. Waters's lead vocal is treated with a reverse echo. The lead instrument is an electric guitar with an added delay effect, playing roots (mostly D, G and A over a melody in D minor). The bass and guitar figure heard during the verses, G to A, is similar to the one in "Waiting for the Worms", a song that appears much later in the album. During the transition to "Another Brick in the Wall, Pt. 2", the key shifts from D minor to the relative major, F major, with dramatic drum rolls and harmony vocals.

On the album, "The Happiest Days of Our Lives" segues into "Another Brick in the Wall, Pt. 2" with a loud, high-pitched scream by Roger Waters, similar to one of the band's earlier work: Careful with That Axe, Eugene. Because of this segue, many radio stations play one right after the other, and subsequent Floyd compilation albums (both Echoes and A Foot in the Door) use this song as the extended intro to "Another Brick in the Wall".

In the film based on the album, the sound at the beginning of the song is depicted as coming from a train entering a large tunnel, rather than a helicopter, as heard on the album. According to Gerald Scarfe, there was supposed to be a puppet of the teacher at the end of the tunnel in the film. Alan Parker made shots of it, but it didn't work out, so they used Alex McAvoy, who played the schoolteacher, to do the scene instead. Before the cut in the middle for the Schoolmaster to mock Pink, somewhat quiet hysterical laughter is heard, extremely similar to the Schoolmaster's voice. Additionally, the song is slightly faster and the bass is noticeably louder compared to the album version.

Plot
The Wall tells the story of Pink, an embittered and alienated rock star in retreat from society and personal relationships. "The Happiest Days of Our Lives" concerns Pink's youth, attending a school run by strict and often violent teachers who treat the pupils with contempt.

According to Waters, the lyrics were a reflection of his own negative experience in school. He described this in an interview with Tommy Vance of BBC Radio One.

Film version
Pink and his two friends go down to a railway track to lay bullets on the rails and watch them explode under the passing train. Pink, putting himself up against the tunnel wall, sees that the train cars are packed with faceless people. He sees his teacher at the other end of the tunnel yelling at him to stand still. In the next scene, in Pink's school, the teacher discovers Pink writing a poem (which contains lyrics from "Money") and, as punishment, ridicules Pink by reading his poem out loud to the entire class then slaps his left hand with a ruler. The following scene shows the Schoolmaster in his own home, being forced to eat a piece of tough meat during dinner at his wife's silent command. To relieve himself of his humiliation, the teacher spanks a child with a belt the next day. Immediately after this comes “Another Brick in the Wall, Part 2”.

Personnel
Roger Waters – bass guitar, lead vocals, backing vocals, background laughter, voice of schoolmaster 
David Gilmour – guitars
Richard Wright – clavinet, synthesizer, Hammond organ
Nick Mason –toms, floor tom, snare and kick drum

with:

James Guthrie – hi-hat and choke cymbal

Personnel per Fitch and Mahon.

References
 Fitch, Vernon. The Pink Floyd Encyclopedia (3rd edition), 2005. .

Notes

External links

Pink Floyd songs
1979 songs
Songs written by Roger Waters
Songs about school
Songs about educators
Song recordings produced by Bob Ezrin
Song recordings produced by David Gilmour
Song recordings produced by Roger Waters